The Town of Coolangatta was a local government area in South East Queensland, Australia, centred on Coolangatta. It existed from 1914 to 1949.

History
On 11 November 1879, the Nerang Division was created as one of 74 divisions within Queensland under the Divisional Boards Act 1879. With the passage of the Local Authorities Act 1902, Nerang Division became the Shire of Nerang on 31 March 1903.

On 12 June 1914, subdivision 3 of Shire of Nerang was separated to create the Town of Coolangatta.

Amalgamations in 1948
On 9 December 1948, as part of a major reorganisation of local government in South East Queensland, an Order in Council replacing ten former local government areas between the City of Brisbane and the New South Wales border with only four. The former ten were:
 Beaudesert
 Beenleigh
 Cleveland
 Coolangatta
 Coomera
 Nerang
 Southport
 Tamborine
 Tingalpa
 Waterford

The four resulting local government areas were:
 Town of South Coast, an amalgamation of the Towns of Coolangatta and Southport with the Burleigh Heads part of Nerang (which later became City of Gold Coast)
 the new Shire of Albert: a merger of Beenleigh, Coomera, Nerang (except for the Burleigh Heads area), the southern part of Tingalpa and the eastern part of Waterford
 an enlarged Shire of Beaudesert, an amalgamation of Beaudesert and Tamborine with the western part of Waterford
 the new Redland Shire, an amalgamation of Cleveland and the northern part of Tingalpa (which later became Redland City)

The Order came into effect on 10 June 1949, when the first elections were held.

Mayors

References

External links
 

Former local government areas of Queensland
1914 establishments in Australia
Coolangatta
1949 disestablishments in Australia